The Zee Cine Award Best Background Music is chosen by the jury and the winner is announced at the ceremony.

The winners are listed below:-

See also 

 Zee Cine Awards
 Bollywood
 Cinema of India

Zee Cine Awards